John Tait may refer to:

 John Tait (American football) (born 1975), professional football player
 John Tait (architect) (1787–1856), Scottish architect
 John Tait (entrepreneur) (1871–1955), Australian film and theatre entrepreneur
 John Tait (horseman) (1813–1888), Australian Thoroughbred racehorse owner/trainer in Australian Racing Hall of Fame
 John Tait (rugby union) (born 1973), Canadian rugby player
 John Tait (runner) (1888–1971), Olympic athlete
 John Guthrie Tait (1861–1945), Scottish educator and international rugby union player
 John W. Tait (born 1945), Egyptologist and Edwards Professor for the Institute of Archaeology at University College London
 John Barclay Tait (1900–1973), British hydrographist
 John Robinson Tait (1834–1909), American landscape painter, art critic, and travel writer
 John Tait (physiologist) (1878–1944), Scots-born professor of physiology at McGill University

See also
 Jack Tait (disambiguation)
 John Tate (disambiguation)